Emamzadeh Abbas (also Romanized as Emāmzādeh ‘Abbās) is a village in Dasht-e Abbas Rural District, Musian District, Dehloran County, Ilam Province, Iran. At the 2006 census, its population was 85, in 15 families.

References 

Populated places in Dehloran County